Ken Ebb is an Australian former professional rugby league footballer who played for Cronulla-Sutherland.

Ebb, an Engadine Dragons junior, played first-grade with Cronulla from 1989 to 1992. In his first two seasons he played off the bench whenever he broke into first-grade, then in 1991 and 1992 he made several appearance as starting lock.

References

External links
Ken Ebb at Rugby League project

Year of birth missing (living people)
Living people
Australian rugby league players
Cronulla-Sutherland Sharks players
Rugby league locks